Christian Schmidt (9 June 1888 – 19 March 1917) was a German international footballer.

References

1888 births
1917 deaths
Association football goalkeepers
German footballers
Germany international footballers
Stuttgarter Kickers players
German military personnel killed in World War I
Place of birth missing